Babikovka is a rural locality (a village) in Malyginskoye Rural Settlement, Kovrovsky District, Vladimir Oblast, Russia. The population was 8 as of 2010.

Geography 
Babikovka is located 20 km north of Kovrov (the district's administrative centre) by road. Rogozinikha is the nearest rural locality.

References 

Rural localities in Kovrovsky District